Science and technology in Germany has a long and illustrious history, and research and development efforts form an integral part of the country's economy. Germany has been the home of some of the most prominent researchers in various scientific disciplines, notably physics, mathematics, chemistry and engineering. Before World War II, Germany had produced more Nobel laureates in scientific fields than any other nation, and was the preeminent country in the natural sciences.

The German language was an important language of science from the late 19th century through the end of World War II. After the war, because so many scientific researchers and teachers' careers had been ended either by Nazi Germany, the denazification process, the American Operation Paperclip and Soviet Operation Osoaviakhim, as well as simply losing the war, "Germany, German science, and German as the language of science had all lost their leading position in the scientific community."

Today, scientific research in the country is supported by industry, the network of German universities and scientific state-institutions such as the Max Planck Society and the Deutsche Forschungsgemeinschaft. The raw output of scientific research from Germany consistently ranks among the world's highest. Germany was declared the most innovative country in the world in the 2020 Bloomberg Innovation Index and was ranked 8th in the WIPO Global Innovation Index in 2022.

Institutions

Foundations
 Alexander von Humboldt Foundation
 Deutsche Forschungsgemeinschaft (DFG)
 Federal Ministry for Economics and Technology (BMWi)
 German Academic Exchange Service (DAAD), promoting international exchange of scientists and students)

National science libraries
 German National Library of Economics (ZWB)
 German National Library of Medicine (ZB MED)
 German National Library of Science and Technology (TIB)

Research organizations

 Helmholtz Association of German Research Centres (complex systems und lage-scale research)
 Fraunhofer Society (applied research and mission oriented research)
 Leibniz Association (fundamental and applied research)
 Max Planck Society (fundamental research)
 Gesellschaft für Angewandte Mathematik und Mechanik

Prize committees
The Gottfried Wilhelm Leibniz Prize is granted to ten scientists and academics every year. With a maximum of €2.5 million per award it is one of highest endowed research prizes in the world. The prize and the mentioned organization above is named after the German polymath and philosopher Gottfried Wilhelm Leibniz (1646–1716), who was a contemporary and competitor of Isaac Newton (1642–1727).

Scientific fields

Johannes Kepler (1571–1630) was one of the originators of the so-called Scientific Revolution of the 16th and 17th centuries. He was an astronomer, physicist, mathematician and natural philosopher. Johannes Kepler discovered the laws according to which planets are moving around the sun, who were called Kepler's laws after him. With his introduction to calculating with logarithms, Kepler contributed to the spread of this type of calculation. In mathematics, a numerical method for calculating integrals was named former Kepler's barrel rule. He made optics to a subject of scientific investigation and confirmed the discoveries made with the telescope by his contemporary Galileo Galilei. He worked on the theory of the telescope and invented the refracting astronomical or Keplerian telescope, which involved a considerable improvement over the Galilean telescope.

Physics

The work of Albert Einstein and Max Planck was crucial to the foundation of modern physics, which Werner Heisenberg and Erwin Schrödinger developed further. They were preceded by such key physicists as Hermann von Helmholtz, Joseph von Fraunhofer, and Gabriel Daniel Fahrenheit, among others. Wilhelm Conrad Röntgen discovered X-rays, an accomplishment that made him the first winner of the Nobel Prize in Physics in 1901 and eventually earned him an element name, roentgenium. Heinrich Rudolf Hertz's work in the domain of electromagnetic radiation were pivotal to the development of modern telecommunication.  Mathematical aerodynamics was developed in Germany, especially by Ludwig Prandtl.

Paul Forman in 1971 argued the remarkable scientific achievements in quantum physics were the cross-product of the hostile intellectual atmosphere whereby many scientists rejected Weimar Germany and Jewish scientists, revolts against causality, determinism and materialism, and the creation of the revolutionary new theory of quantum mechanics. The scientists adjusted to the intellectual environment by dropping Newtonian causality from quantum mechanics, thereby opening up an entirely new and highly successful approach to physics. The "Forman Thesis" has generated an intense debate among historians of science.

Chemistry

Justus von Liebig (1803 – 1873) made major contributions to agricultural and biological chemistry, and is considered one of the principal founders of organic chemistry.

At the start of the 20th century, Germany garnered fourteen of the first thirty-one Nobel Prizes in Chemistry, starting with Hermann Emil Fischer in 1902 and until Carl Bosch and Friedrich Bergius in 1931.

Otto Hahn is considered a pioneer of radioactivity and radiochemistry with the discovery of nuclear fission together with the Austrian scientist Lise Meitner and Fritz Strassmann in 1938, the scientific and technological basis for the utilization of atomic energy.

The bio-chemist Adolf Butenandt independently worked out the molecular structure of the primary male sex hormone of testosterone and was the first to successfully synthesize it from cholesterol in 1935.

Engineering

Germany has been the home of many famous inventors and engineers, such as Johannes Gutenberg, who is credited with the invention of movable type printing in Europe; Hans Geiger, the creator of the Geiger counter; and Konrad Zuse, who built the first electronic computer. German inventors, engineers and industrialists such as Zeppelin, Siemens, Daimler, Diesel, Otto, Wankel, Von Braun and Benz helped shape modern automotive and air transportation technology including the beginnings of space travel. The engineer Otto Lilienthal laid some of the fundamentals for the science of aviation.

The physicist and optician Ernst Abbe (1840–1905) founded in the 19th century together with the entrepreneurs Carl Zeiss (1840–1905) and Otto Schott (1851–1935) the basics of modern Optical engineering and developed many optical instruments like microscopes and telescopes. Since 1899 he was the sole owner of the Carl Zeiss AG and played a decisive role of setting up the enterprise Jenaer Glaswerk Schott & Gen (today Schott AG). These enterprises are very successful worldwide up to our time (21st century).

In the Thirties of the 20th century the electrical engineers Ernst Ruska and Max Knoll developed at the "Technische Hochschule zu Berlin" the first electron microscope.

Biological and earth sciences

Emil Behring, Ferdinand Cohn, Paul Ehrlich, Robert Koch, Friedrich Loeffler and Rudolph Virchow, six key figures in microbiology, were from Germany. Alexander von Humboldt's (1769–1859) work as a natural scientist and explorer was foundational to biogeography, he was one of the outstanding scientists of his time and a shining example for Charles Darwin. Wladimir Köppen (1846–1940) was an eclectic Russian-born botanist and climatologist who synthesized global relationships between climate, vegetation and soil types into a classification system that is used, with some modifications, to this day. The Frankfurt surgeon, botanist, microbiologist, and mycologist Anton de Bary (18311888) laid one of the fundamentals of the plant pathology and was one of the discoverer of the symbiosis of organisms.

Ernst Haeckel (1834 – 1919) discovered, described and named thousands of new species, mapped a tree of life relating all life forms and coined many terms in biology, for example ecology and phylum. His  published artwork of different lifeforms includes over 100 detailed, multi-colour illustrations of animals and sea creatures, collected in his Kunstformen der Natur ("Art Forms of Nature"), an international bestseller and a book which would go on to influence the Art Nouveau (German Jugendstil, youth style). But Haeckel was also a promoter of scientific racism and embraced the idea of Social Darwinism.

Alfred Wegener (1880–1930), a similarly interdisciplinary scientist, was one of the first people to hypothesize the theory of continental drift which was later developed into the overarching geological theory of plate tectonics.

Psychology
Wilhelm Wundt is credited with the establishment of psychology as an independent empirical science through his construction of the first laboratory at the University of Leipzig in 1879.

In the beginning of the 20th century, the Kaiser Wilhelm Institute founded by Oskar and Cécile Vogt was among the world's leading institutions in the field of brain research. They collaborated with Korbinian Brodmann to map areas of the cerebral cortex.

After the National Socialistic laws banning Jewish doctors in 1933, the fields of neurology and psychiatry faced a decline of 65% of its professors and teachers. The research shifted to a 'Nazi neurology', with subjects such as eugenics or euthanasia.

Humanities

Besides natural sciences, German researchers have added much to the development of humanities. Johann Joachim Winckelmann (17171768) was a German art historian and archaeologist, "the prophet and founding hero of modern archaeology". Heinrich Schliemann was a wealthy businessman and a devotee of the historicity of places mentioned in the works of Homer and an archaeological excavator of Hisarlik (since 1871), now presumed to be the site of Troy, along with the Mycenaean sites Mycenae and Tiryns. Theodor Mommsen is widely counted as one of the greatest classicists of the 19th century; his work regarding Roman history is still of fundamental importance for contemporary research. Max Weber was together with Karl Marx among the most important theorists of the development of modern Western society and is regarded as one of the founder of the Sociology.

Contemporary examples are the philosopher Jürgen Habermas, the Egyptologist Jan Assmann, the sociologist Niklas Luhmann, the historian Reinhart Koselleck and the legal historian Michael Stolleis. In order to promote the international visibility of research in these fields a new prize, Geisteswissenschaften International, was established in 2008. It serves the translation of studies in humanities into English.

See also

 German inventors and discoverers
 German inventions and discoveries
 Operation Paperclip
 Technology during World War II
 Körber European Science Prize

Notes

References
Competing Modernities: Science and Education, Kathryn Olesko and Christoph Strupp. (A comparative analysis of the history of science and education in Germany and the United States)
English section of the Federal Ministry of Education and Research's website
Germany's science and research landscape
Articles and dossiers about Research and Technology in Germany, Goethe-Institut
Audretsch, D. B., Lehmann, E. E., & Schenkenhofer, J. (2018). Internationalization strategies of hidden champions: lessons from Germany. Multinational Business Review.

External links

 Federal Ministry of Education and Research
 Deutsche Forschungsgemeinschaft
 Research-in-germany.org 

 

de:Deutschland#Wissenschaft